The Estación Científica Antártica Ruperto Elichiribehety (English: Ruperto Elichiribehety Antarctic Scientific Station; better known in English by its Spanish acronym ECARE) is an Uruguay summer research station in Antarctica, established by the Uruguayan Antarctic Institute on December 22, 1997 on the Antarctic Peninsula.

ECARE is located in Hut Cove, southeast of Hope Bay in the northeastern part of the Antarctic Peninsula, next to the Argentinian Esperanza Base.
The Station can accommodate eight people, and it is dedicated to support scientific projects in the surrounding area. It was formerly the British Station D, known as Trinity House.

The station is named in honour of Ruperto Elichiribehety, a Uruguayan Navy Lieutenant who, in 1916, led the Uruguayan Expedition attempting to rescue the Shackleton-Rowett Expedition that was lost on Elephant Island.

See also
 List of Antarctic research stations
 List of Antarctic field camps

References

External links 
 The 2007 ROU 4 Artigas, Uruguayan ship supporting ECARE
 A Cristy Trembly report on her visit to Artigas and ECARE bases in 2000.

Outposts of Antarctica
Uruguay and the Antarctic
1997 establishments in Antarctica